Anupama Jaiswal is an Indian politician and a member of 17th Legislative Assembly of Uttar Pradesh of India. She represents the Bahraich constituency of Uttar Pradesh and is a member of the Bharatiya Janata Party.

Early life and education
Jaiswal was born 2 March 1967 in Bahraich,  Uttar Pradesh to her father Ravindra Kant Jaiswal. She belongs to Kalwar (Jaiswal) community. In 1989 she married Ashok Kumar Jaiswal, who is a Bank Manager by profession, they have one son (Shivam Jaiwal) and two daughters (Aishwarya Jaiswal & Swati Shree Jaiswal). In 1999, she got Master of Arts degree and in 2010 she got Bachelor of Laws degree from Dr. Ram Manohar Lohia Avadh University, Faizabad.

Political career
Jaiswal is a member of Seventeenth Legislative Assembly of Uttar Pradesh. In 2017 elections she was elected MLA from Bahraich, she defeated her nearest rival Samajwadi Party candidate Rubab Sayda by a margin of 6,702 votes.
She was appointed Minister of State for Basic Education, Child Development and Nutrition, Revenue, Finance in Yogi Adityanath ministry.

References

1967 births
Living people
People from Bahraich
Uttar Pradesh MLAs 2017–2022
Bharatiya Janata Party politicians from Uttar Pradesh
Women members of the Uttar Pradesh Legislative Assembly
Yogi ministry
21st-century Indian women politicians
21st-century Indian politicians
Uttar Pradesh MLAs 2022–2027